Yaroslavshchina is a rural locality (a village) in Dobryansky District, Perm Krai, Russia. The population was 10 as of 2010.

Geography 
Yaroslavshchina is located 51 km northeast of Dobryanka (the district's administrative centre) by road. Sofronyata is the nearest rural locality.

References 

Rural localities in Dobryansky District